The 1966 PGA Championship was the 48th PGA Championship, played July 21–24 at the South Course of Firestone Country Club in Akron, Ohio. Al Geiberger won his only major championship, four strokes ahead of runner-up Dudley Wysong.

Sam Snead, age 54, was co-leader and leader after the first two days, but shot 75 in the third round on Saturday. Geiberger carded a two-under 68 to lead by four strokes over Wysong, who shot a 66. Both shot two-over 72 on Sunday as both bogeyed the first two holes. The lead shrunk to two as Wysong birdied the third while Geiberger bogeyed the fourth, but then birdied the fifth and ninth holes to regain the four-stroke advantage.

The 1966 championship was originally scheduled to be held at Columbine Country Club in Columbine Valley, Colorado, a suburb south of Denver. A flash flood of the adjacent South Platte River in June 1965 caused significant damage to the course and forced a postponement. Firestone was scheduled to host in 1967, so the venues swapped years.

This was the second of three PGA Championships at the South Course, which previously hosted in 1960 and later in 1975. It is the current venue for the WGC-Bridgestone Invitational, which began in 1976 as the "World Series of Golf" on the PGA Tour,  preceded by the American Golf Classic, which debuted in 1961.

Past champions in the field

Made the cut

Missed the cut

Source:

Round summaries

First round
Thursday, July 21, 1966

Source:

Second round
Friday, July 22, 1966

Source:

Third round
Saturday, July 23, 1966

Source:

Final round
Sunday, July 24, 1966

Source:

Lema and wife killed
Hours after the championship's conclusion on Sunday, Tony Lema and his wife Betty were among four fatalities in a chartered private plane crash near the Indiana-Illinois border. Lema, age 32, had finished tied for 34th and was heading west to a Monday tournament in the Chicago area. Both pilots of the twin-engine Beechcraft Bonanza were also killed as they attempted an emergency landing on a golf course in Lansing, Illinois, near the destination airport.

References

External links
PGA Media Guide 2012
GolfCompendium.com: – 1966 PGA Championship
PGA.com – 1966 PGA Championship

PGA Championship
Golf in Ohio
Sports competitions in Ohio
Sports in Akron, Ohio
PGA Championship
PGA Championship
PGA Championship
PGA Championship